Girl Friend is a 2002 Indian Telugu-language romantic drama film directed by G. Nageswara Reddy and starring Rohit, Anitha Patil, Babloo, and Santosh Pavan.

The film released to mixed reviews although the film's dialogues and music were praised.

Cast 

Rohit as Vamsi
Anitha Patil as Suvarna
Babloo as Babloo
Santosh Pavan as Pavan
Chalapathi Rao as Vamsi's father
Tanikella Bharani as Suvarna's father
L. B. Sriram as Babloo's father
Mallikarjuna Rao as Pavan's father
Sivaparvathi as Vamsi's mother
Padmaja Choudary as Babloo's mother
Padma Jayanti as Pavan's mother
M. S. Narayana as college principal
Ali as a film producer
Ruthika as an actress (cameo appearance in the song "Thaluku Thaluku")

Soundtrack 
The music was composed by Vandemataram Srinivas.

Reception 
Gudipoodi Srihari of The Hindu opined that "It is a routine film that shows the whole college in a bad light". Jeevi of Idlebrain.com wrote that "This film is a paisa-vasool film". Manju Latha Kalanidhi of Full Hyderabad criticised the film for being in the same tried and tested genre as Nuvve Kavali.

Box office 
Similar to G. Nageswara Reddy's and Rohit's first outing, 6 Teens, this film was also a box office success.

References 

2002 films
Indian romantic drama films
2000s Telugu-language films